State Road 24 (NM 24) is a state highway in the US state of New Mexico. NM 24's western terminus is at NM 130 southwest of Mayhill, and the eastern terminus is at U.S. Route 82 (US 82) north-northeast of Dunken.

Major intersections

See also

References

024
Transportation in Chaves County, New Mexico
Transportation in Otero County, New Mexico